Independence Day, observed annually on 5 July, is a National Holiday in Algeria commemorating colonial Algerian independence from France on 5 July 1962.

Algerian War (1954–1962) 

The Algerian War of Independence began in November 1954 and ended in 1962. The war was very brutal and long, and was the most recent major turning point in Algeria's history. Although often fratricidal, it ultimately united Algerians and raised the value of independence and the philosophy of anticolonialism into the national consciousness. Abusive tactics of the French Army remains a controversial subject in France to this day.

In the early morning hours (12:00 am) of 1 November 1954, the National Liberation Army (L'armée de Libération Nationale—ALN) launched attacks throughout Algeria in the opening salvo of a war of independence. An important watershed in this war was the massacre of civilians by the FLN near the town of Philippeville in August 1955. The government claimed it killed 1,273 guerrillas in retaliation; according to the FLN, 12,000 Muslims perished in an orgy of bloodletting by the armed forces and police, as well as colon gangs. After Philippeville, all-out war began in Algeria. The FLN fought largely using guerrilla and terrorist tactics whilst the French counter-insurgency tactics often included severe reprisals and repression.

Eventually, protracted negotiations led to a cease-fire signed by France and the FLN on March 18, 1962, at Evian, France. The Evian accords also provided for continuing economic, financial, technical, and cultural relations, along with interim administrative arrangements until a referendum on self-determination could be held. The Evian accords guaranteed the religious and property rights of French settlers, but the perception that they would not be respected led to the exodus of one million pieds-noirs and harkis.

Between 350.000 and 1 million Algerians are estimated to have died during the war, and more than 2 million, out of a total Muslim population of 9 or 10 million, were made into refugees or forcibly relocated into government-controlled camps. Much of the countryside and agriculture was devastated, along with the modern economy, which had been dominated by urban European settlers (the pied-noirs). French sources estimated that at least 70,000 Muslim civilians were killed or abducted and presumed killed, by the FLN during the Algerian War. Nearly one million people of mostly French, Spanish and Italian descent were forced to flee Algeria at independence due to the unbridgeable rifts opened by the civil war and threats from units of the victorious FLN. Along with them fled most Algerians of Jewish descent and those Muslim Algerians who had supported a French Algeria (harkis). 30–150,000 pro-French Muslims were also killed in Algeria by FLN in post-war reprisals.

French President Charles De Gaulle pronounced Algeria an independent country on 3 July. The decision was published in the official journal the following day, and Algerian leaders declared 5 July, the anniversary of the French arrival in Algiers, to be Independence Day.

See also 
 Public holidays in Algeria

References

External links

The Colonial System and Algerian Nationalism

Public holidays in Algeria
July observances
Algeria
Algerian War
Algerian nationalism
Algerian culture